Sunrise Peak is a prominent  volcanic mountain summit located in the Gifford Pinchot National Forest, in Skamania County of Washington state. Precipitation runoff from Sunrise Peak drains into tributaries of the Cowlitz River drainage basin. The Sunrise Trail (#262) and Juniper Ridge Trail (#261, #261A) provide access to this remote peak, with minor scrambling at the summit.

Geology

The history of the formation of the Cascade Mountains dates back millions of years ago to the late Eocene Epoch. With the North American Plate overriding the Pacific Plate, episodes of volcanic igneous activity occurred. Due to Mount Saint Helens' proximity to Sunrise Peak, volcanic ash is common in the area. Sunrise Peak is composed of Pliocene-Miocene andesitic magma that intruded up into older volcanic rocks more than five million years ago and is now surrounded by a forest of old-growth Douglas fir and mountain hemlock.

Climate

Sunrise Peak is located in the marine west coast climate zone of western North America. Most weather fronts originate in the Pacific Ocean, and travel northeast toward the Cascade Mountains. As fronts approach, they are forced upward by the peaks of the Cascade Range (Orographic lift), causing them to drop their moisture in the form of rain or snowfall onto the Cascades. As a result, the west side of the Cascades experiences high precipitation, especially during the winter months in the form of snowfall. During winter months, weather is usually cloudy, but due to high pressure systems over the Pacific Ocean that intensify during summer months, there is often little or no cloud cover during the summer.

See also

 Geology of the Pacific Northwest
 Dark Divide
 List of mountain peaks of Washington (state)

References

External links
 Weather forecast: Sunrise Peak
 Trail #261A Sunrise Peak: Gifford Pinchot National Forest
 Hiking Sunrise Peak: Washington Trails Association

Cascade Range
Mountains of Skamania County, Washington
Mountains of Washington (state)